Gordon Collingridge was an Australian actor during the silent film era. He played many matinee idol type roles, most notably for director Beaumont Smith and opposite Louise Lovely in Jewelled Nights (1925). Lovely called him "the male screen star to the manner born."

He had spent a number of years working on Queensland stations.

Selected filmography
Circumstance (1922)
Townies and Hayseeds (1923)
Prehistoric Hayseeds (1923)
The Dingo (1923)
The Digger Earl (1924)
Dope (1924)
Joe (1924)
Jewelled Nights (1925)
Hills of Hate (1926)
The Romance of Runnibede (1928)
Trooper O'Brien (1928)

References

External links
 
 Biographical cuttings at National Library of Australia

Australian male silent film actors
20th-century Australian male actors
Year of birth missing
Year of death missing